Kharampur Mazar Sharif is a mazar (mausoleum) in the village of Kharampur, Akhaura Upazila, Brahmanbaria District, Bangladesh. Built on the burial ground of Syed Ahmad Gesudaraz, the mausoleum is visited by hundreds of devotees.

History
In 1303, the Conquest of Gour commenced and Gesudaraz was a disciple of Shah Jalal. Following its success, Gesudaraz was one of the 12 lascars to join Syed Nasiruddin in the Capture of Taraf. Gesudaraz then settled in Kharampur, Akhaura near the Kalidas Sagar, now known as the Titas River. Gesudaraz (later known as Kella Baba or Pir Kalla) devoted himself to propagating Islam and under his guidance, many Hindus and Buddhists converted to Islam. He is buried in Kharampur.

Festivals
A peaceful village fair is held every year in Kharampur Mazar Sharif during the Urs period.

References

Mosques in Bangladesh